Oliver Heaviside (1850–1925) was a mathematician and physicist.

Heaviside may also refer to:

Science
 Heaviside step function
 Heaviside cover-up method
 Heaviside condition
 Heaviside layer or Kennelly–Heaviside layer
 Heaviside (lunar crater)
 Heaviside (Martian crater)
 Heaviside's dolphin, named in honour of 19th-century mariner Captain Haviside (also spelled Heaviside)

People
 John Heaviside Clark (c. 1771–1836), Scottish artist
 John Heaviside (footballer) (born 1943), English footballer
 Michael Heaviside (1880–1939), Victoria Cross recipient

Others
 Heaviside, an electric-powered aircraft under development by the Kitty Hawk Corporation